Estadio Leonel Placido is a soccer stadium in Puerto Plata, Dominican Republic.  It is currently used for football matches and hosts the home games of Atlantico FC of the Liga Dominicana de Fútbol.  The stadium holds 2,000 spectators.

External links
http://ldf.com.do/cibao-futbol-club/
https://foursquare.com/v/estadio-leonel-placido/55272426498e2e4418bcd63d
http://paleterodegazcue.blogspot.com/2015/03/estadios-y-precios-de-boletas-liga.html
http://int.soccerway.com/venues/dominican-republic/cancha-municipal-puerto-plata/v20519/

Football venues in the Dominican Republic
Buildings and structures in Puerto Plata Province
Puerto Plata, Dominican Republic